Exposed is a 1947 American crime film directed by George Blair and written by Royal K. Cole and Charles Moran. The film stars Adele Mara, Mark Roberts, Lorna Gray, Robert Armstrong, William Haade and Bob Steele. The film was released on September 8, 1947, by Republic Pictures.

A beautiful female private detective is hired by a wealthy businessman to check up on his stepson—the heir to the family fortune—who has been withdrawing large amounts of money from his bank account, taken an apartment in the city and is generally acting suspiciously. She soon finds herself mixed up in secret experiments, shadowy underworld figures and, finally, the murder of her employer.

Cast   
Adele Mara as Belinda Prentice
Mark Roberts as William Foresman III 
Lorna Gray as Judith Foresman
Robert Armstrong as Inspector Prentice
William Haade as Iggy Broty
Bob Steele as Chicago
Harry Shannon as Severance
Charles Evans as Jonathan Lowell
Joyce Compton as Emmy
Russell Hicks as Colonel Bentry
Paul E. Burns as Profosser Ordson
Colin Campbell as Dr. Richard
Edward Gargan as Big Mac
Mary Gordon as Miss Keets
Patricia Knox as Waitress

References

External links 
 

1947 films
American crime films
1947 crime films
Republic Pictures films
Films directed by George Blair
American black-and-white films
1940s English-language films
1940s American films